Breutelia pendula is a species of moss.  It occurs in Australia and New Zealand, including the subantarctic islands of Macquarie, Campbell, the Aucklands and the Antipodes.

References

Bartramiales
Flora of New South Wales
Flora of Victoria (Australia)
Flora of the Australian Capital Territory
Flora of Tasmania
Flora of New Zealand
Flora of Macquarie Island
Flora of the Antipodes Islands
Flora of the Campbell Islands
Flora of the Auckland Islands
Plants described in 1859